Alexander Stuart (born 8 August 1940) is a Scottish former footballer and manager who played as a left-back.

Beginning his career in 1958 with Dundee, Stuart went on to spend ten years at Dens Park, winning the Scottish Football League in 1961–62 and gaining a Scottish Cup runners-up medal two years later. In 1969, Stuart moved to city rivals Dundee United but left within the year to become player/manager at Montrose. Stuart spent six years at Links Park.

He moved to succeed Ally MacLeod at Premier Division side Ayr United in 1975-76 season. He kept the part-time side in the top flight for two seasons. He had a short, final managerial spell with St Johnstone at the end of the 1970s. Stuart went on to become a sports administrator, working on a project for Dundee and Dundee United to share a youth academy. He is now retired.

After creating many sports centres throughout Dundee, he is now to thank for providing facilities for younger players to try and improve their football. In 2017, he was inducted into the Dundee Hall of Fame for being a part of the 'Golden Era'.

Honours

Dundee
 Scottish Football League: 1
 1961–62
 Scottish Cup Runner-up: 1
 1963–64

References

1940 births
Living people
Scottish footballers
Dundee F.C. players
Montrose F.C. players
Dundee United F.C. players
Scottish Football League players
Scottish football managers
Montrose F.C. managers
Ayr United F.C. managers
St Johnstone F.C. managers
Knattspyrnufélag Reykjavíkur managers
Scottish Football League managers
Scottish expatriate football managers
Expatriate football managers in Iceland
Scottish expatriate sportspeople in Iceland
Footballers from Aberdeen
Association football fullbacks